CFWC may refer to:

CFWC-FM, a Canadian radio station, broadcasting at 93.9 FM in Brantford, Ontario.
Central Financial Work Commission, a governmental body made in 1998 to regulate the Chinese financial system.
California Federation of Women's Clubs, an organization of Women's clubs in California
Colorado Federation of Women's Clubs